Act of Faith may refer to:

 Act of Faith (Christian), a prayer said by persons at the age of accountability
 "Act of Faith" (Presence song)
 Act of Faith (album), an album by Mucky Pup
 "Act of Faith," a 1946 short story by Irwin Shaw
 "Act of Faith", a song by Katey Sagal from Well...
 Auto-da-fé, the ritual of public penance of condemned heretics and apostates